Goncourt is a station on line 11 of the Paris Métro in the 10th and 11th arrondissements. It is named after the nearby rue des Goncourt, which was named after the writers Edmond de Goncourt (1822–1896) and his brother Jules de Goncourt (1830–1870). Edmond de Goncourt left funds to create the Académie Goncourt which awards the Prix Goncourt literary prize.

History 
The station opened as part of the original section of the line from Châtelet to Porte des Lilas on 28 April 1935.

As part of the "Un métro + beau" programme by the RATP, the station was renovated and modernised on 25 April 2003.

On 1 April 2017, half of the nameplates on the station's platforms were temporarily replaced by the RATP as part of April Fool's Day, along with 10 other stations by adorning the stations with original puns and illustrated pop culture references. It was humorously renamed "Nº1 au Goncourt de Beauté".

As part of modernization works for the extension of the line to Rosny-Bois-Perrier in 2023 for the Grand Paris Express, the station was closed from 9 January 2019 to 26 February 2019 to raise its platform levels and its surface tiled to accommodate the new rolling stock that will be used (MP 14) to accommodate the expected increase in passengers and to improve the station's accessibility. On 30 July 2021, 2 new entrances were opened at rue d'Aix and rue Bichat.

In 2019, the station was used by 2,192,190 passengers, making it the 234th busiest of the Métro network out of 302 stations.

In 2020, the station was used by 1,829,817 passengers amidst the COVID-19 pandemic, making it the 132nd busiest of the Métro network out of 305 stations.

Passenger services

Access 
The station has 6 entrances:

 Entrance 1: Hôpital Saint-Louis
 Entrance 2: rue du Faubourg-du-Temple
 Entrance 3: avenue Parmentier
 Entrance 4: rue des Goncourt
 Entrance 5: rue d'Aix
 Entrance 6: rue Bichat – Canal Saint-Martin

Station layout

Platforms 
The station has a standard configuration with 2 tracks surrounded by 2 side platforms.

Other connections 
The station is also served by lines 20, 46, and 75 of the RATP bus network, and at night, by lines N12 and N23 of the Noctilien bus network.

Nearby 

 Canal Saint-Martin
 Église Saint-Joseph-des-Nations
 Hôpital Saint-Louis
 Palais des glaces
 Square Jules-Verne

Gallery

References

Paris Métro line 11
Paris Métro stations in the 10th arrondissement of Paris
Paris Métro stations in the 11th arrondissement of Paris
Railway stations in France opened in 1935